Don Levy (1932 – January 1987) was an artist and filmmaker.

Levy was born in Bathurst, New South Wales, Australia.  After studying theoretical chemistry at the University of Sydney, he was awarded a Research Scholarship to the University of Cambridge. There he obtained a PhD in Theoretical Chemical Physics in 1960. While at Cambridge, Levy became involved in the Film Society and made his first short films. After Cambridge he was awarded the first ever film scholarship in Britain to study in the newly created Film Department of the Slade School of Fine Art under the leadership of filmmaker turned lecturer Thorold Dickinson. He then made a number of short films for the Nuffield Foundation, including the experimental documentary Time Is (1964).

In 1962, he obtained a film-making grant from the British Film Institute Experimental Film Fund for the production of an experimental feature film, Herostratus. The film, made on a shoe-string budget, took over five years to be completed. It was co-financed between the BFI, the BBC and former BFI Director James Quinn. It was released in May 1968, opening at the ICA in London, subsequently being screened at film festivals.

In 1968, Levy took up a position at the Carpenter Center for the Visual Arts at Harvard University, where he stayed for two years. He then moved to Los Angeles to work at the California Institute of the Arts until his death in 1987 by committing suicide.

References

Further reading
 Anne Bowman, "Interview: Don Levy", Cinema Papers, 13 April 1970, pp. 6–7
 "Interview with Don Levy", Cantrill Film Notes, August 1973, pp. 18–21
 Bruce Beresford, "A Cinema Interview: Don Levy", Cinema, March 1969, pp. 14–17

1932 births
1987 deaths
Australian film directors
Australian film producers
Harvard University people
Alumni of the Slade School of Fine Art
1987 suicides